Transient receptor potential cation channel subfamily M member 4 (hTRPM4), also known as melastatin-4, is a protein that in humans is encoded by the  TRPM4 gene.

TRPM4 Channel Blocker
9-Phenanthrol
TRPM4-IN-5

See also
 TRPM

References

Further reading

External links 
 

Ion channels